is a former Japanese football player.

Club career
Ishikawa was born in Fujieda on December 25, 1979. After graduating from the University of Tsukuba, he joined the Kashima Antlers in 2002. He gradually played more often as left side back during the first season and the Antlers won the championship in the 2002 J.League Cup and second place in the 2002 Emperor's Cup and 2003 J.League Cup. However he did not play as often after Toru Araiba came to the Antlers in 2004. In May 2006, he moved to Tokyo Verdy and played more often. 
He moved to Montedio Yamagata in 2007. He became a regular player as a left side back for a long time. In 2014, he played as left stopper of a three-back defense. He retired at the end of the 2017 season.

National team career
In April 1999, when Ishikawa was a University of Tsukuba student, he was selected by the Japan U-20 national team for the 1999 World Youth Championship. At this tournament, he played five matches and Japan won second place.

Club statistics

1Includes A3 Champions Cup and Promotion Playoffs to J1.

Honors and awards
 FIFA World Youth Championship runner-up: 1999

References

External links

1979 births
Living people
University of Tsukuba alumni
Association football people from Shizuoka Prefecture
Japanese footballers
Japan youth international footballers
J1 League players
J2 League players
Kashima Antlers players
Tokyo Verdy players
Montedio Yamagata players
Association football defenders
People from Fujieda, Shizuoka